opened in Mifune, Kumamoto Prefecture, Japan in 1998. The museum collects, preserves, researches, and displays the dinosaur fossils found in the area; the collection, which includes Japan's first fossil from a meat-eating dinosaur, Mifunesaurus, numbers some 15,000 items.

See also
 Fukui Prefectural Dinosaur Museum

References

External links
  Mifune Dinosaur Museum

Mifune, Kumamoto
Museums in Kumamoto Prefecture
Museums established in 1998
1998 establishments in Japan
Natural history museums in Japan
Dinosaur museums